A cut-off, battle jacket, battle vest or kutte in heavy metal subcultures, is a type of vest or jacket which originated in the U.S. military, specifically the Army Air Corps, where pilots and other aviation personnel would collect patches or other insignia to put on regulation bomber jackets or flight suits. The practice continued within the biker subculture and auto racing subculture and later found popularity in punk and various heavy metal subcultures. Biker, auto racing, metal and punk subcultures differ in how the garment is prepared, what decorations are applied, and how this is done.

Cut-offs are usually made from leather or denim jackets with their sleeves removed, or cut very short, and often adorned with patches, badges and painted artwork that display motorcycle club affiliations known as colours, or alternatively band names, political affiliations, beliefs, or sexual acts performed.

In the 1970s and 1980s, cut-offs were almost always blue denim. Thrash metal fans favoured heavily washed denim, while members of one British motorcycle club bleached theirs until they were almost white. From the mid to late 1990s, some punks and metalheads have worn multi-pocketed hunting or fishing vests, both in plain colours and camouflage patterns, and leather cut-offs—always popular with punks, and with bikers in recent decades.

Punk and hardcore

In punk subculture, cut-offs are often leather (but can also be denim). Typical decorations are metal studs and badges (often painted-on) of bands or political causes, with cloth patches being secondary, ultimately because of the difficulty of doing the required needlework on tough leather. In addition, sleeves are more likely to be kept attached to the body of the jacket. As part of the DIY philosophy of the hardcore punk scene, the vests may be home-repaired with heavy thread, dental floss, or safety pins, and the band logos may be put on using paint and crude home-made stencils. Some wearers also drape chains or other paraphernalia from the vest.

Heavy metal

Cut-offs in the heavy metal scene are often adorned with patches of logos and album covers of bands, ranging in size from small square patches to large patches that fill the back panel of the vest. 
The cut-off patch jackets first got popular during the NWOBHM (New wave of British heavy metal).  Patches are the main decoration.  Studs and badges also adorn cut-offs and continue to be popular to this day.

References

Jackets
1970s fashion
1980s fashion
Punk fashion
Heavy metal fashion
Motorcycling subculture